This is a list of lists of spacecraft.

 List of crewed spacecraft
 List of Solar System probes
 List of active Solar System probes
 List of lunar probes
 List of Mars landers
 List of Mars orbiters
 List of space telescopes
 List of X-ray space telescopes
 List of proposed space observatories
 List of cargo spacecraft
 List of Falcon 9 first-stage boosters
 List of heaviest spacecraft
 List of spacecraft called Sputnik
 List of spacecraft powered by non-rechargeable batteries
 List of spacecraft with electric propulsion
 List of spaceplanes
 List of upper stages
 List of spacecraft deployed from the International Space Station

See also
 Lists of astronomical objects
 Lists of telescopes
 List of government space agencies
 Lists of astronauts
 Lists of space scientists

External references
 List of All Spacecraft Ever Launched, accessed 02/10/2019
 Space Missions and Space Craft, accessed 02/10/2019
 26 Types of Spacecraft, accessed 02/10/2019